Cricket S. Myers is an American sound designer based in Los Angeles, California, United States. She graduated with a MFA from California Institute of the Arts and has since then worked on over 300 productions around LA. She was nominated for a Tony Award for Best Sound Design in 2011 for Bengal Tiger at the Baghdad Zoo and won best sound at the Drama Desk Award. In 2007 LiveDesign named her a Young Designer to Watch.

Awards and nominations

References

American sound designers
California Institute of the Arts alumni
Living people
Year of birth missing (living people)
Place of birth missing (living people)